Piano sonatas may refer to:
 Piano sonatas (Beethoven)
 Piano sonatas (Boulez)
 Piano sonatas (Chopin)